Charles Onyancha (born 7 March 1952-) is a Kenyan politician. He belongs to the Orange Democratic Movement and was elected to represent Bonchari Constituency in the National Assembly of Kenya since the 2007 Kenyan parliamentary election.

Born: 7 March 1952

References

Living people
Orange Democratic Movement politicians
Members of the National Assembly (Kenya)
1952 births